Jean-Michel Dalgabio (15 September 1788, Riva Valdobbia, Piedmont — 31 December 1852, Oullins) was a French architect.

A protégé of Antoine Vaudoyer, Dalgabio became the town architect of Saint-Étienne and taught there at the School of Architecture. Among his notable works are the cemetery chapel, abattoirs, Exchange (1820), Town Hall, and other administration buildings of Saint-Étienne (1821–8). He also oversaw the building of the local barracks, prison, and corn market.

References

External links

1788 births
1852 deaths
19th-century French architects
People from Saint-Étienne
Architecture educators